Portrait of an Unknown Gentleman is an oil painting by El Greco.

Painted in Toledo between 1603 and 1607, and on display at the Museo del Prado, it has been cited as a possible portrait of Miguel de Cervantes, based on the fact that the author and playwright was living near Toledo in 1604 and that he knew people within El Greco's circle of friends.

It is one of a series of secular portraits of unknown gentlemen, all of them dressed in black and wearing white ruffs, against dark backgrounds, the most famous of which is El caballero de la mano en el pecho (The Nobleman with his Hand on his Chest) (ca. 1580).

References

Paintings by El Greco in the Museo del Prado
Unknown Gentleman
1600s paintings
Cultural depictions of Miguel de Cervantes